is a role-playing video game developed by Japanese developer Gust Co. Ltd. for the PlayStation 2. A "Portable+" version for PlayStation Portable was released on 1 October 2009 (Japan only). The game is the direct sequel to Mana Khemia: Alchemists of Al-Revis, as well as the tenth installment to the Atelier series.

Gameplay
Mana Khemia 2 is classified as a console role-playing video game and is a direct sequel to Mana Khemia: Alchemists of Al-Revis also created by Gust.

Like its predecessor, the core of this game focuses on alchemy through which players can create items, weapons, armors and accessories to be used throughout the duration of the game. These alchemy recipes can be attained through field explorations, completing certain jobs or bought in shops. Each item has its own special properties, from elemental attributes to special skills (called "Common Skills") which are useful during battle. Like the previous installment, the quality of an item depends on its "Ether Level" which starts at 50 and can either increase or decrease according to the selected elemental attributes on the "alchemy wheel." New recipes can be derived from older ones depending on the ingredient selected during item creation.

In the field, players are confronted by visible monsters. Once the player bumps into a monster, one of the four PlayStation controller buttons will be displayed. If the player manages to quickly input the corresponding button, the player gets an advantage in battle allowing the characters to strike first. Unlike the first Mana Khemia, players will only have five permanent characters in their group (three in the active party, two/three in reserve), the sixth being a "Guest" character which will only participate during certain events. Guests are playable during battle but feature inaccessible equipment and status parameters. Players can call in the reserve characters for an extra attack or to defend against an incoming attack. The switched-out character will have to wait a certain amount of time before being available to switch again.

As more hits are inflicted upon the enemies, the battle gauge will build up; "Unite Mode" will initiate once it maxes out. The "Unite Mode" is akin to the "Burst Mode" from the previous game in which damage dealt will be critical and the amount of time reduced for reserve characters to act again. In Mana Khemia 2, the "Intimate Attack" (known previously as "Co-op Attack") can only be executed during "Unite Mode." An "Intimate Attack" is a combo attack achieved by switching in both characters in reserve consecutively, dealing more damage than an ordinary attack (much like "Variable Strike" from Mana Khemia). Also returning from Mana Khemia is the "Finishing Burst," a powerful single character attack which requires the player to fill up a separate gauge only available during "Unite Mode."

Like the previous game, this game has no levels and instead depends entirely on "Grow Books" to increase the characters' stats. A "Grow Book" requires the player to create items through alchemy to unlock slots containing stat boosts acquirable by distributing AP (Ability Points) gained during battle. Mana Khemia 2 adds another layer to the Grow Book by requiring an Ether Level of 100 (the highest) for an item, weapon, armor, or accessory in order to unlock the third slot for that specific creation, thus encouraging the player to plan out the synthesis before using any ingredients in alchemy.

The game is presented as a series of terms at Al-Revis Academy.  Each term is made up of several weeks, typically starting and ending with an event and ultimately leading to a key battle at the conclusion. Between main story events, the player is generally required to complete two or three courses, earning grades for how well each course was completed. Once in free time, the player is free to take jobs with Cole (money) as a reward, initiate a "Character Story" (known as "Character Quest" in Mana Khemia) which reveals more about a particular character, or participate in the "Bazaar" which allows the sale of items the player has created and leads to the resale of those items later (bypassing the need to recreate them in the alchemy workshop).

Story
At the start of the game, players are given a choice between two characters: Razeluxe Meitzen (or Raze for short) or Ulrika Mulberry. The events that play out following the choice of characters differs greatly as Raze's route deals with his past while Ulrika's route deals with the origin of Mana. But in either character's playthrough, the core events will still remain the same (taking alchemy classes and school events), though the jobs available may slightly differ.

The game prologue describes Al-Revis Academy (アルレビス学園 Aru-Rebisu Gakuen), a famous alchemy school which used to be floating, separated from the Lower World (where ordinary humans live). But due to the weakening power of Mana which kept the school afloat, Al-Revis Academy plummets down to the Lower World. It soon manages to adapt to the surroundings with the help of students and teachers and resumes its activities in teaching alchemy.

But due to the school's dwindling budget, they have to search for sponsors to keep the school running and Marta Schevesti was given the position of 'Chairman' (理事長 rijichou) of the school due to her being the spokesperson of the sponsors. She proposed to start a new class; 'Combat Class' (戦闘技術 sentou gijitsu) so that more students will enroll in the school to boost the school's finance. But her main goal is to remove alchemy from the school's syllabus stating that "it's a waste of money" (a rough translation).

Al-Revis Academy's principal, Zeppel (of the previous game), was a little too weak-willed to stop her and he seeks Flay (also from the first Mana Khemia) to help and appoints Flay as the classroom teacher for the new class, which Raze and Etward enroll in. Tony (the third recurring character from the previous game) is the homeroom teacher for the alchemy class, with Ulrika, Chloe and Lily under him.

Characters

Playable characters

Roze/Raze's workshop
If the player decides to play Roze/Raze as the main character, the following characters will be the initial playable characters. The characters in Ulrika's workshop will be rivals, but will be playable later on in the game.

Rozeluxe, or Razeluxe as he is called in the English version, is one of the main characters the players are able to choose at the start of the game. He seems to have a sort of pent-up hatred towards Manas due to certain events in his childhood. His only existing relative is his grandfather, Eugene, who brings him to the Vehlendorf mansion where he becomes a servant to the young lady of the house, Lily. Quiet and withdrawn, he usually distances himself from people and doesn't seem fond of interfering with others' problems. He has a kind heart though, and seems oblivious to Lily's obvious crush for him. Early in the game, he is given a Ring of Light by Reicher, which he is then unable to remove after putting it on. The ring enables Raze to change his weapon (which was originally a knife) into a 'Sword of Light', capable of dealing grievous damage to Mana-type enemies. He is also capable of changing his sword into other weapons, such as a Spear for his Intimate Strike.

Liliane (or Lily for short) is Razeluxe's master and the daughter of the rich and famous Vehlendorf family. Having a big crush on Raze, she brings him along with her when she goes to Al-Revis Academy so that she can be alone with him. She has an overactive imagination and a great liking for Puni (a type of monster common in games developed by Gust), so much so is her liking for Puni that she has the ability to sense any nearby. She also hires Yun, another Mana, to help around in her atelier. Her maid, Whim, does the actual fighting for her in the game. In her ending, it was revealed Raze actually knew about her crush all along but pretends to be oblivious out of amusement.

Lily's personal maid whom she brought along to Al-Revis Academy. She sometimes speaks too bluntly about her master and gets "punished" (as in knuckles-to-the-head sort of punishment) by Lily. Even though Lily usually pushes her around, she still has a great fondness for Lily and tries to please her; often causing unwanted results. Whim is a Water Mana and thus uses water and ice-based skills in battle. Wuim's true form appears to be a mermaid, with a similar appearance to that of the Mana series' Undine.

A cheerful, energetic and bubbly girl who is in the same class as Raze. She and her younger brother, Enna, used to be Lily's playmates when they were younger. She often does things without much thought, dragging Raze along most of the time. Et also has an unhealthy attachment to her younger brother and is often doing things which she thinks is helping Enna out but causes more trouble for him instead. She is often seen as forgetful (often forgets the place where she is supposed to go for her assignments) and fun-loving (one of the person who supports the pro-academy festival faction) as well as liking battles (becomes enthusiastic when battles are mentioned). In her ending she visit Raze, revealing her affections for him. In battle, she fights with a pair of chakram that she can either strike with at close range or toss from long range. She also can manipulate its form into a bow and arrow for one of her moves.

Yun is a Fire Mana hired by Lily for a year's duration with 5,000,000 Cole. He is also the quiet type and does what his employer asks him to do, however absurd it may be. He does not have a contractor currently, as his previous Owner died leaving behind a daughter for him to take care of. He occasionally picks up odd jobs whenever he is free to earn extra money. In battle, he reverts to his original Mana form for his Finishing Strike. In this form his hair grows out and seems to be on fire, and his claws extend quite a bit as well as having a pair of horns on his forehead. He seems to be a sort of otaku in his 4th Character Quest.

A little girl who was adopted by the Puni Brothers; Taro (the eldest), Jiro (the second) and Saburo (the youngest, renamed Kichi in the English version in reference to the Puni brothers present in previous Atelier games). Because of that, she can only speak the Puni language. The Puni Brothers brought her to Al-Revis so she could learn the human language and adapt back into human society. Even though Puniyo is normally helpful and cooperative, she seems to have a stubborn streak in her sometimes (due to the Puni Brothers spoiling her too much). Out of the three brothers, Jiro usually carries her around and translates her words to the others. She looks similar to the Puni Mages of the Atelier Iris games, which normally appear with Puni-type enemies. In her ending, Raze visited her family and celebrated their graduation with them; Raze is referred to as Puniyo's husband by her father.

Ulrika's workshop
If the player decides to play Ulrika as the main character, the following characters will be the initial playable characters. The characters in Raze's workshop will be rivals, but will be playable later on in the game.

Renamed Ulrika Mulberry in the English version, Ulrika is one of the two main characters that players can choose at the start of the game. She has a very cheerful personality and is a little bit forgetful at times. In her childhood, she receives a "Mana egg" from a traveling old man who tells her to take good care of it. After 10 years of taking care of it, she decides to enroll in Al-Revis Academy to learn alchemy and to find a way to make the egg hatch so that she would get a Mana of her own. She tends to act without thinking and does not see eye-to-eye with Raze in their first encounter. The English version has her voiced with a typical Texas drawl giving the impression that she's a country bumpkin, but nothing in the original Japanese script implied she was a country girl nor was her manner of speech different. Unusually, Ulrika has some strange "disease" (Congenital Puni Aphasic Disorder) according to Pepperoni that makes her unable to understand punis (they will only say Puni around her when it has been shown they can speak human language perfectly well).

Ulrika's best friend, whom she drags along with her when Ulrika enrolls in Al-Revis. She has a dark personality and views almost everyone as her guinea pigs to be used in her experiments. She is mostly quiet, calm and collected... though whenever she speaks, her words are either insulting or belittling. She calls the items she makes "omajinai", which sort of means "good luck charm" instead of the term "curse" (noroi) which Ulrika refers to them as. In the English version, she refers to them as "incantations" and seems to be downplayed to the point of being very gloomy.

A self-proclaimed fairy. He lives in the forest south-east of the school with his "sensei", a Wood fairy, and does odd jobs around the house. He joined Ulrika when she requested his help due to Tony's insistence that her group should have one male member before venturing into more dangerous areas. Even though he's big and muscular, he actually acts like a child, addressing the rest of the workshop members as "onee-san" (older sister) (to Ulrika and Chloe) and "onii-san" (older brother) (to Ena). Seems to have known Goto for a long time. In the English version, he flamboyantly speaks with a slight lisp and calls himself Pepperoni for short, even though his Japanese nickname is 'Peperon'.  He is suspected to be the child of the Mana-Human pair which began the chain of events as he's registered as a Mana type when fighting but as stated by him he's neither Mana nor Human.

Etward's younger brother, who is always trying to avoid getting involved with his older sister. He is in the same class as Puniyo and seems to be able to understand her without needing a translation. He was forced to join Ulrika's atelier when he lied about having already joined an atelier when Et tried to recruit him to Roze's. Despite his young age, he acts more like an adult than Ulrika. According to Ena, Et used to be his name but his sister wanted the name because it sounded nicer and made them switch. It's hinted that Ena has a crush on Puniyo, as he's especially nice to her. He is also one of the more normal ones (as stated by Chloe) in Ulrika's atelier.

A mysterious being assuming the form of an animal doll that seems to have been friends with Peperoncino for a long time. His real form is that of the "round ball" the doll holds. Many girls in the school are attracted to him for unknown reasons, which he says is because of his "passionate eyes, deep voice and cute body". Incidentally, Marta (the Director of the academy) has a crush on him. He seems immensely fond of Ulrika, often trying to get her attention. His previous form was that of a raccoon and other animals (as said by Pepperoni describes his current form as that of a "pegasus". His actual form is that of a tall red-haired man as seen in his ending.

Other characters

A Mana of Soul who finally emerged from the "Mana Egg" that Ulrika received from the dark mana king, after 10 years. It is only capable of saying "Uuu" though it is also able to barely pronounce words which Ulrika tries to teach it (like Ulrika's name, which Uryu says it as "U-ryuu-ri-ka" instead of "U-ru-ri-ka"). It is quite attached to her and tries to protect her if there is any danger. Uryu mostly appears in Ulrika's route.

A woman who is appointed as the "Chairman" of Al-Revis Academy. She is a no-nonsense woman and is the one behind the implementation of the new "Art of Battle" class. She aims to remove the alchemy subject from the school syllabus because she says that it's a "waste of money". Happens to have a crush on Gotou at first sight and continues to see him in his ending.

A mysterious man possessing the 'Ring of Light' who gave a similar item to Raze. Seems to be working for someone and was commissioned to eradicate Manas. He appears more often in Raze's route, though there are brief occasions where he appears in Ulrika's. In the English version, he is called Reicher. He is seen as a person who loves to fight and becomes bored with weaker people.

A mysterious archer woman; she and Rewrich are working together. She appears as a very energetic and cheerful girl who often professes her love for Rewrich and pesters him to give her a wedding ring. She was sent after Ulrika's Mana.

Yun's ward and is very good at being sarcastic to others, causing Yun and Raze a lot of problems when she appears. She is actually the daughter of Yun's contractor who made Yun promise to take care of Corona when he dies. Corona is one of the main reasons (if not the main reason) Yun works hard at earning money. She becomes Yun's contractor in his ending and hires Raze as a bodyguard.

The eldest of the Puni Brothers. He is the unofficial leader amongst his brothers and is seen as the strongest Puni. He is often serious and strict with others. He is playable in some of Puniyo's Story.

The second of the Puni Brothers. Most of the time, he is seen carrying Puniyo on his back and is the one translating her speech. He appears to be the calm and collected type who provides wisdom when the others are troubled. He is playable in some of Puniyo's Story.

The youngest of the Puni Brothers. In the English version, he is called Kichi instead of Saburo, in reference to the Puni brothers in previous Atelier games. He talks in a lazy slow drawl and is often picked on by others like Liliane and Pepperoni in one of his character quests. He is playable in some of Puniyo's Story.

Light Mana King
The one who commissions Reicher to hunt mana down, after the child born of a human and a mana resulted in the mana's death. He is a hidden boss in the extra scenario. It's also stated he was defeated by Flay once.

Dark Mana King
The old man who gave the mana egg to Ulrika, he opposes the Light Mana King, as without being with humans new mana can't be born.

 A mana under the Light Mana's service, she watches over Reicher and Uryu.

Returning characters

Now the principal of Al-Revis Academy, he is still as timid and weak-willed as before. He tries to make the school prosper and retain its former glory but his lack of guts caused him to get pushed around by Marta and even the students. When Marta suggests that the alchemy subject be removed, he seeks out Gunnar, in hopes that he will be able to stop her plans.

The teacher of the "Art of Battle" class that has just been implemented. He is still trying to take over the world and has a secret organization located somewhere underneath the school. For now, he is teaching alchemy (even though he is supposed to teach only battle skills) as well as battle skills to his students. He is still fond of appearing and disappearing at will and often thinks up extreme ideas when it comes to a school event or a task for his students to perform. He is Raze's classroom teacher. In North American release of the first Mana-Khemia, he is known as Flay Gunnar, which translated over to the sequel for consistency purposes.

He has been teaching alchemy in Al-Revis Academy for quite some time after the school fell to the Lower World. He still acts like his former self but has a soft side towards his students. Tony often picks fights with Gunnar due to their school-days enmity (in Mana Khemia) and encourages his students to be better than Gunnar's.  He is Ulrika's classroom teacher. A brief conversation with Zeppel during the Academy Festival in Ulrika's route, reveals that he is married and has not gone home in 3 years.

Soundtrack
The soundtrack was composed by Ken Nakagawa and Daisuke Achiwa. It was released May 21, 2008 in Japan by Team Entertainment.

Opening Song
 My Silly Days by Marie

Insert Songs
希望告げる風～合唱版～ (Kibou Tsugeru Kaze~Gasshouban~ / The Wind That Reveals Hope~Chorus Version~) by Gust Staff
Namenloses Licht by Yuto Izumi

Ending Song
 Sail by Mami Yanagi

Reception

The game received above-average reviews according to the review aggregation website Metacritic. In Japan, Famitsu gave it a score of 32 out of 40.

Notes

References

External links
 

2008 video games
Gust Corporation games
Japanese role-playing video games
Nippon Ichi Software games
PlayStation 2 games
PlayStation Network games
PlayStation Portable games
School-themed video games
Video games developed in Japan 
Video games featuring female protagonists
Video game sequels
Atelier (video game series)